Jacopo Trulla (Vicenza, 5 July 2000) is an Italian rugby union player. His usual position is as a wing, and he currently plays for Zebre.

Trulla represented Calvisano in the 2019–20 European Rugby Challenge Cup. For the last matches of 2019–20 Pro14 and for 2020–21 Pro14 season, he was named as Permit Player for Zebre.

In 2019 and 2020, Trulla  was also named in the Italy Under 20 squad for the 2019 Six Nations Under 20s Championship and in 2020 the squad for the 2020 Six Nations Under 20s Championship. From November 2020 he is also part of Italy squad.  On the 14 October 2021, he was selected by Alessandro Troncon to be part of an Italy A 28-man squad for the 2021 end-of-year rugby union internationals.

References

External links 
All Rugby Profile
Rugby Calvisano Profile
It's Rugby France Profile

2000 births
Living people
Italian rugby union players
Rugby Calvisano players
Zebre Parma players
Rugby union wings
Rugby union fullbacks
Italy international rugby union players
Sportspeople from Vicenza